John Stephen Hore (born 18 August 1982) is an English footballer who played in The Football League for Carlisle United.

After singing from Kettering Town, he played 11 games for Mossley, scoring twice, before he moved to Workington.

References

External links

Post War English & Scottish Football League A - Z Player's Transfer Database profile

English footballers
Carlisle United F.C. players
Gretna F.C. players
English Football League players
Scottish Football League players
1982 births
Living people
Kettering Town F.C. players
Footballers from Liverpool
Association football forwards
Mossley A.F.C. players
Workington A.F.C. players